Ilayathangudi is a village located near Tirupathur in the Sivaganga district of Tamil Nadu. It is famous for Kailasanathar Nithyakalyani Temple which is one of the nine temples held in high esteem by the Chettinad Nagarathar community.

It also has the Adhistanam temple of the 65th Shankaracharya of the Kanchi Matha, Pujyasri Sudarsana Mahadevendra Saraswati.

References

Villages in Sivaganga district